Shahqoli Khan Zanganeh (died 1716), was a Kurdish nobleman, who served as the vizier of the Safavid king (shah) Sultan Husayn (r. 1694–1722) from 1707 to 1716.

Family
Shahqoli was the third son of Shaykh Ali Khan Zanganeh, who also served as vizier from 1669 to 1689, whose other sons were: Hossein Ali Khan Zanganeh, Suleiman Khan Zanganeh, Ismail Beg Zanganeh, Abbas Beg Zanganeh, and Abbas Qoli Beg Zanganeh. The family belonged to the Zanganeh tribe, a Sunni Kurdish tribe native to the Kermanshah Province.

Biography 
Shahqoli is first mentioned in 1680s, as being appointed the governor of Kermanshah Province. In 1689, his father died due to illness. One year later, a powerful and high-ranking aristocrat named Saru Khan Sahandlu, had 40 members of the Zanganeh tribe killed, which made Shahqoli protest to shah Suleiman I, stating that Saru Khan had humiliated the name of his deceased father by doing so. Suleiman forgave Saru Khan, due to the good relation they had. However, this was soon to end: in 1691, Suleiman had Saru Khan beheaded due to having a love relationship with Maryam Begum, the aunt of Suleiman. 

The shah then appointed Shahqoli as the head of the royal bodyguard (qurchi-bashi), thus succeeding Saru Khan. After having been appointed to such as high-ranking office, a rivalry with the recently appointed vizier Mohammad Taher Vahid Qazvini followed. In 1694, Suleiman died and was succeeded by his son Sultan Husayn, who later in 1699, appointed a Turkoman member of the Shamlu tribe named Mohammad Mo'men Khan Shamlu, as the new vizier. 

In 1707, Shahqoli Khan was appointed as the new vizier of the empire. Shahqoli Khan died in 1716, and was succeeded by his son-in-law Fath-Ali Khan Daghestani. Shahqoli had a son, also named Shaykh Ali Khan, who although did not reach the same height of power as his father and grandfather, still served in high-office under the Safavids.

References

Sources 
 
 
 
 
 

Grand viziers of the Safavid Empire
Iranian Kurdish people
17th-century births
1716 deaths
History of Kermanshah Province
Safavid governors
Zanganeh
Qurchi-bashi
18th-century Iranian politicians
17th-century Iranian politicians
17th-century people of Safavid Iran
18th-century people of Safavid Iran